Claudia Brassard-Riebesehl (born 3 March 1975 in Kuala Lumpur) is a Malaysian-born Canadian former basketball player who competed in the 2000 Summer Olympics.

References 

1975 births
Living people
Canadian women's basketball players
Olympic basketball players of Canada
Basketball players at the 2000 Summer Olympics
Malaysian emigrants to Canada
Sportspeople from Kuala Lumpur